Linanthus watsonii (syn. Leptodactylon watsonii) is a species of flowering plant in the phlox family known by the common name Watson's prickly phlox. It is native to the western United States, where it occurs in Colorado, Idaho, Nevada, Utah, and Wyoming.

This perennial subshrub forms a mat up to 10 centimeters high. The leaves are usually oppositely arranged. Each is divided into a number of needlelike parts and they measure up to 2 centimeters in length. The flowers are white or yellowish with six lobes on a corolla up to 2.8 centimeters long.

This plant grows in mountains, foothills, and canyons. It grows in rock cracks and cliffsides in a number of habitat types. The soils are calcareous.

The plant is vulnerable to threats because it has a small and limited population size, but it grows in mostly inaccessible locations on the walls of cliffs and canyons, so it is often protected from most threats.

References

External links

watsonii
Flora of North America